Massimiliano Pesenti (born 13 April 1987) is an Italian footballer who plays as a forward for Serie D club Sant'Angelo.

Career
Born in Treviglio, the Province of Bergamo, Pesenti started his career at AlbinoLeffe. In January 2007 he left for Serie C2 side Prato. On 1 July 2007 he returned to the Province of Bergamo and awarded no.19 shirt of the first team. But loaned to Serie C2 side Canavese in August 2007. In the 2008–09 season, he was initially call-up to AlbinoLeffe's pre-season summer training camp, and awarded no.99 shirt, but left for Lega Pro Prima Divisione (ex-Serie C1) side Lumezzane in August 2008. and his loan was extended in July 2009.

In 2010–11 season he changed his shirt number to no.54.

In summer 2011 Pesenti was signed by Prato. In summer 2015 he finally left the club after a relegation to Serie D.

On 15 July 2015 he was signed by Reggiana.

On 14 January 2019 he signed with Pisa.

On 2 September 2019 he signed with Padova.

On 2 October 2020 he moved to Arezzo.

On 31 January 2022, Pesenti joined Pro Patria.

References

External links
 Football.it Profile 
 

1987 births
People from Treviglio
Sportspeople from the Province of Bergamo
Footballers from Lombardy
Living people
Italian footballers
U.C. AlbinoLeffe players
A.C. Prato players
F.C. Lumezzane V.G.Z. A.S.D. players
Piacenza Calcio 1919 players
Pisa S.C. players
Calcio Padova players
S.S. Arezzo players
Aurora Pro Patria 1919 players
A.C.D. Sant'Angelo 1907 players
Association football forwards
Serie B players
Serie C players
Serie D players